Tudor Arghezi (21 May 1880 – 14 July 1967) was a Romanian writer, best known for his unique contribution to poetry and children's literature. Born Ion N. Theodorescu in Bucharest, he explained that his pen name was related to Argesis, the Latin name for the Argeș River.

Biography

Early life
He graduated from Saint Sava High School in October 1896, started working to pay for his studies, and made his debut in 1896, publishing verses in Alexandru Macedonski's magazine Liga Ortodoxă under the name Ion Theo. Soon after, Macedonski, the herald of Romanian Symbolism, publicized his praise for the young poet: 
"This young man, at an age when I was still prattling verses, with an audacity that knows no boundaries, but not yet crowned by the most glittering success, parts with the entire old versification technique, with all banalities in images in ideas that have for long been judged, here and elsewhere, as a summit of poetry and art."

He began stating his admiration for Symbolism and other trends pertaining to it (such as the Vienna Secession) in his articles of the time, while polemicizing with Junimea'''s George Panu over the latter's critique of modernist literature. In 1904, he and Vasile Demetrius published their own magazine, Linia Dreaptă, which ceased to exist after only five issues. Arghezi, Gala Galaction, and Demetrius maintained a close friendship, as witnessed by the latter's daughter, the actress and novelist Lucia Demetrius.

After a four-year-long stint as an Orthodox monk at Cernica Monastery, he traveled abroad in 1905. He visited Paris and then moved to Fribourg, where he wrote poetry and attended courses at the local University; dissatisfied with the Roman Catholic focus encouraged by the latter, he moved to Geneva, where he was employed in a jeweler's workshop. During the Romanian Peasants' Revolt of 1907, the poet, known for his left-wing discourse and vocal criticism of the violent repression of the peasant movement, was kept under surveillance by Swiss authorities; a local newspaper claimed that Arghezi's mail had been tampered with, causing a scandal that led to the resignation of several officials. News he gathered of the revolt itself left a lasting impression on Arghezi: much later, he was to dedicate an entire volume to the events (his 1907-Peizaje, "Landscapes of 1907", which he described as "dealing with [...] the contrast between a nation and an abusive, solitary, class").

Early 1910s
He returned to Romania in 1910, and published works in Viața Românească, Teatru, Rampa, and N. D. Cocea's Facla and Viața Socială, as well as editing the magazine Cronica in collaboration with Galaction; his output was prolific, and a flurry of lyrics, political pamphlets and polemical articles gained him a good measure of notoriety among the theatrical, political and literary circles of the day. Cocea contributed to his early fame by publishing one of Arghezi's first influential poems, Rugă de seară ("Evening Prayer").

During the period, Arghezi also became a prominent art critic, and engaged in the defense of Ștefan Luchian, a painter who was suffering from multiple sclerosis and was facing charges of fraud (based on the suspicion that he could no longer paint, and had allowed his name to be signed to other people's works).

He became a regular presence at the Bucharest Kübler Café, where a Bohemian circle of artists and intellectuals was being formed — it included the writers Ion Minulescu, Liviu Rebreanu, Eugen Lovinescu, Victor Eftimiu, Mihail Sorbul and Corneliu Moldovanu, as well as the painters Iosif Iser, Alexandru Satmari, Jean Alexandru Steriadi, the composer Alfons Castaldi, and the art collector Krikor Zambaccian. According to Zambaccian, Arghezi was more rarely seen at Bucharest's other major literary venue, Casa Capșa. By that time, he was also an associate of the controversial political figure and art patron Alexandru Bogdan-Pitești, and, with Galaction, Cocea, Minulescu, Adrian Maniu and various visual artists, he regularly attended a circle hosted by Bogdan-Pitești on Știrbey-Vodă, nearby the Cișmigiu Gardens. He authored a small poem in honor of Bogdan-Pitești.

After the outbreak of World War I, Arghezi wrote against the political camp led by the National Liberals and the group around Take Ionescu, both of whom aimed to have Romania enter the conflict on the side of the Entente (as an attempt the conquer Transylvania from Austria-Hungary); instead, he was a supporter of Bessarabia's union with the Romanian Old Kingdom, and resented the implicit alliance with Imperial Russia. In 1915, he wrote:
"A barbaric war. Once upon a time, we had pledged our duty to fight against the arming of civilized states. With every newborn baby, the quantity of explosive matter destined to suppress him was also being created. As progress and «rational outlook» were being viewed as calamities, arms and ammunitions factories were increasing the shell storages, were fabricating the artillery used in extermination."

German occupation and Văcărești prison
Eventually, he collaborated with the German authorities who had occupied most of Romania in late 1916 (see Romanian Campaign), and wrote articles for the German-backed Gazeta Bucureștilor; he was one among the diverse grouping of intellectuals to do so — it also included Bogdan-Pitești, Galaction, Constantin Stere, Dimitrie D. Pătrășcanu, Alexandru Marghiloman, Ioan Slavici, Grigore Antipa, and Simion Mehedinți.

Arrested along with eleven other newspapermen and writers, among them Slavici, he was accused of "collaboration with the enemy" for his anti-Entente activities. According to Arghezi himself, the Royal Commissioner charged with investigation had initially kept the group secluded in a Bucharest hotel, arguing that they were an ongoing danger to Allied forces in Bucharest.

Sentenced and imprisoned in the Văcărești facility, Arghezi pleaded his cause in letters and petitions addressed to a "Mr. General", who has been tentatively identified with Premier Artur Văitoianu, asking for a conditional release after his illegitimate son, Eli Lotar, with Constanța Zissu, who had been born in 1905, left home and went missing. Despite their political rivalry, Nicolae Iorga, who had given his full backing to the Entente during the war, repeatedly called on authorities to pardon Arghezi free; his plea was eventually granted, and Arghezi was released in late 1919. Expressing his thanks to Iorga for his intervention, he nonetheless continued to oppose him on several issues, and the polemic, turned sarcastic, was to prolong itself over the next two decades.

Interwar literature
In 1927, he published his first volume of collected poems, titled Cuvinte Potrivite ("Fitting Words" or "Suitable Words"), which made the Poporanist paper Viața Românească's Mihai Ralea hail Arghezi as "our greatest poet since Eminescu" (while likening his "mixture of the sublime and the awkward" to "nihilism"). The avant-garde magazine Integral celebrated Arghezi with a special issue in 1925 – in it, Benjamin Fondane wrote: "Arghezi is against all things: in his poetry, against eloquence, in favour of reinstating modesty, decency [...] [i]n his prose, against cowardice in expression, in favour of violence and indecency".

Arghezi was in charge of the satirical newspaper Bilete de Papagal and published his first prose effort, Icoane de Lemn ("Wooden Icons"), in 1928. In 1932, he published Flori de Mucigai ("Flowers of Mildew") and Poarta Neagră ("The Black Gate") – collections of poetry inspired by the years he spent in detention (in itself, a theme never before used in Romanian poetry) and influenced by the works of Charles Baudelaire and other Symbolists. He also began writing the works that made him most familiar to the public, his poems and short prose for children. Among the more famous are Cartea cu Jucării ("The Toy-Laden Book"), Cântec de Adormit Mitzura ("A Song to Get Mitzura to Sleep"), Buruieni ("Weeds") and, the most popular of all, Zdreanță ("Rag"), about a lovable mutt.

In 1933–1934, he completed two satirical pieces, the dystopian novel Tablete din Țara de Kuty, povestiri swiftiene ("Tablets from the Land of Kuty. Swiftian Stories") and Cimitirul Buna-Vestire ("Buna-Vestire Cemetery" – a large-scale pamphlet described as an "apparent novel" by George Călinescu), as well as a long novel on the topic of maternal love and filial devotion, Ochii Maicii Domnului ("Our Lord's Mother's Eyes").

He routinely visited art shows throughout the 1920s (accompanied by Vasile and Lucia Demetrius), helping to establish the artistic reputation of painters such as Oscar Han, Nicolae Dărăscu, Camil Ressu, Francisc Șirato, and Nicolae Vermont. He also authored the preface to Nicolae Tonitza's first art catalog, and welcomed Arta Română, the modernism group established by Tonitza and Gheorghe Petrașcu in 1920. By the mid-1930s, Arghezi contributed the art chronicle to the newspaper Mișcarea – mouthpiece of the National Liberal Party-Brătianu.

Interwar polemic
In 1934, his lyrical works were virulently attacked by Nicolae Iorga, who saw them as "comprising all of the most repulsive in concept and all of the most trivial in shape"; such accusations against Arghezi and the group of writers around him became commonplace in the Iron Guard's press – writing in Sfarmă-Piatră, Vintilă Horia accused Arghezi of "a willing adhesion to pornography" and of "betrayal". The latter statement centered on Arghezi's earlier collaboration with Gândirea – the newspaper published by Nichifor Crainic, an intellectual figure on the far right who shared Arghezi's initial religious traditionalism. Gândirea and its affiliated magazines alleged that the influence of Crainic's thought (Gândirism) had played a major part in Arghezi's early works, while attacking his Jewish editors with anti-Semitic slurs (and implying that his works would have decreased in quality because of their influence). To these, Argezi replied with a dose of irony: "[...] I have never ever read Gândirea, not even when I was contributing articles to it".

Shortly before his death, Arghezi reflected upon his status in the interwar period, rendering a dramatic picture:
"[...] for a while, all the cultural institutions were associated against my writing: the University, the Academy, the poets, the press, the police, the courts, the censorship, the Gendarmerie and even the closest colleagues."

His political attitudes at the time were more complex, and he continued collaboration with left-wing magazines such as Dimineața and Adevărul while expressing staunchly monarchist views and support for King Carol II. According to some views, Arghezi developed a sympathy for the Iron Guard towards the end of the 1930 (his poem Făt-Frumos was contended to be a homage to the movement's leader, Corneliu Zelea Codreanu, assassinated in late 1938). This perspective, notably favored by essayist Alex Mihai Stoenescu, was disputed by the literary critic Ion Simuț, who argued that evidence to support it was sporadic and contradictory.

World War II
In 1939, Arghezi became suddenly and severely ill, being incapacitated by sciatica. The extreme pain and mysterious causes became topics of major interest, and it was rumored that his was an unprecedented disease. Upon examination (made difficult by Arghezi's iatrophobia), some of Romania's top physicians, including Nicolae Gh. Lupu, George Emil Palade, and Constantin Ion Parhon, decided that Arghezi's sciatic nerve was being pressed on by an unknown body. Dumitru Bagdasar identified the cause as a cancerous tumor, and Arghezi underwent radiation therapy — the verdict and suffering caused the poet to maintain a growing animosity towards Bagdasar, which he later expressed in writing. After a period of deterioration, he regained his health unexpectedly.

During World War II the newspaper Informația Zilei took up the publishing of comments by Arghezi, as a column named after his former magazine, Bilete de Papagal. In 1943, it published virulent satires of the Romanian government, its military leader – Ion Antonescu, and Romania's allegiance to Nazi Germany (see Romania during World War II). On 30 September 1943 Arghezi caused an outrage and a minor political scandal, after getting the paper to publish his most radical attack, one aimed at the German ambassador Manfred Freiherr von Killinger – Baroane ("Baron!" or "Thou Baron"). The piece centered on accusations of political and economic domination:
"A flower blossomed in my garden, one like a plumped-up red bird, with a golden kernel. You blemished it. You set your paws on it and now it has dried up. My corn has shot into ears as big as Barbary Doves and you tore them away. You took the fruits out of my orchard by the cartload and gone you were with them. You placed your nib with its tens of thousands of nostrils on the cliffs of my water sources and you quaffed them from their depths and you drained them. Morass and slobber is what you leave behind in the mountains and yellow drought in the flatlands — and out of all the birds with singing tongues you leave me with bevies of rooks."

The authorities confiscated all issues, and the author was imprisoned without trial in a penitentiary camp near Târgu Jiu, in which communist political leaders Gheorghe Gheorghiu-Dej, Nicolae Ceausescu and Ion Gheorghe Maurer were also imprisoned. He was freed in 1944, only days after the August Coup, which resulted in the fall of the Antonescu regime.

Arghezi and the Communist regime
A controversial intellectual, Arghezi had a fluctuating relationship with the newly established Communist regime. Although he was awarded several literary prizes under during the period of Soviet-induced transition to a people's republic, he became a harsh critic of censorship and agitprop-like state control in media, and was targeted as a decadent poet very soon after the communist-dominated republican institutions took power (1948). A series of articles written by Miron Radu Paraschivescu and Sorin Toma (son of the Stalinist literary figure Alexandru Toma) in the Romanian Communist Party's official voice, Scînteia, described his works as having their origin in Arghezi's "violent insanity", called his style "a pathological phenomenon", and depicted the author as "the main poet of Romanian bourgeoisie"; the articles were headlined Poezia Putrefacţiei sau Putrefacția Poeziei ("The Poetry of Decay or the Decay of Poetry", in reference to Karl Marx's The Misery of Philosophy – the title of which in turn mocked Pierre-Joseph Proudhon's Philosophy of Misery).

The writer had to retreat from public life, spending most of these years at the house he owned in Văcărești, Bucharest, the one he called Mărțișor (the name it still goes by today); his main source of income was provided by selling the yields of cherries the surrounding plot returned.

However, as Gheorghe Gheorghiu-Dej, who was also an inmate in penitentiary camp near Târgu Jiu, consolidated his power over the state and Party post-1952, Arghezi was discovered as an asset to the new, more "national" tone of the regime — as several other censored cultural figures, he was paid a visit by Miron Constantinescu, the Communist activist overseeing the rehabilitation process.

Once exonerated, he started being awarded numerous titles and prizes. Arghezi was elected a member of the Romanian Academy in 1955, and celebrated as national poet on his 80th and 85th birthdays. Although never turned-Socialist Realist, he adapted his themes to the requirements – such as he did in Cântare Omului ("Ode to Mankind") and 1907. In 1965, Arghezi also won recognition abroad, being the recipient of the Herder Prize.

Arghezi's mysterious illness resurfaced with the same symptoms in 1955, and he was rapidly interned in the care of Ion Făgărășanu. He was diagnosed with a chronic infection that had originated in surgery he had undergone in 1934, provoking an abscess in the area around his lumbar vertebrae; he was released soon completing a treatment which included streptomycin injections.

He died and was buried in the garden of his house next to his wife Paraschiva in 1967 (she had died the previous year), with tremendous pomp and funeral festivities orchestrated by Communist Party officials. His home is now a museum. It was managed by his daughter, Mitzura until her death in 2015. Arghezi and Paraschiva also had a son, known as Baruțu, but actually called Iosif.

Arghezi's work
Arghezi is perhaps the most striking figure of Romanian interwar literature, and one of the major poets of the 20th century. The freshness of his vocabulary represents a most original synthesis between the traditional styles and modernism. He has left behind a vast oeuvre, which includes poetry, novels, essays, journalism, translations and letters.

The impact of his writings on Romanian poetic language was revolutionary, through his creation of unusual lyrical structures, new subgenres in prose – such as the poetic novel, the "tablet" (tableta) and the "ticket" (biletul).  He excelled at powerful and concise formulations, the shock value of which he exploited to startle lazy or conformist thinking, and his writings abound in paradoxes, as well as metaphysical or religious arguments. Evidencing the satirical genre's leading role throughout Arghezi's literary career, George Călinescu argued that it had become a contributing factor to much of his poetry and prose fiction.

Arghezi re-established an aesthetic of the grotesque, and experimented at length with prosody. In much of his poetry (notably in his Flori de mucigai and Hore), Arghezi also built upon a tradition of slang and argot usage, creating an atmosphere which, according to Călinescu, recalled the universe of Anton Pann, as well as those of Salvatore Di Giacomo and Cesare Pascarella. He introduced a vocabulary of intentional ugliness and decay, with the manifest goal of extending the limits of poetic language, the major theme in his Cuvinte Potrivite; nevertheless, the other half of Arghezi's poetic universe was that of family life, childhood, and small familiar spaces, rendered in minutely detailed poems. In an era when the idea of the impossibility of communication was fashionable, he stood against his contemporaries through his strong belief in the power of the written word to communicate ideas and feelings — he was described by Tudor Vianu as "a fighting poet, subject to attacks as well as returning them".

Despite his association with the Communist regime, Arghezi is widely acknowledged as a major literary figure. His work has traditionally been a staple of Romanian literature textbooks for decades.

In cultural reference
Aside from various sketches Arghezi had drawn of himself, his portrait was drawn by various artists he met or befriended. Around 1910, he was included in group portraits by Ary Murnu and Camil Ressu, both of which depicted the literary society formed around the Kübler Café in Bucharest. An abstract depiction of Arghezi, showing him as a figure with a hunter case-shaped head, and sitting on an electric chair, was published by M. H. Maxy. Shortly before they died, Arghezi and his wife were the subject of an oil painting by Corneliu Baba.

Tudor Arghezi was several times portrayed in Romanian film: in 1958, Grigore Vasiliu Birlic played a major part in Arghezi's Doi Vecini (a character loosely based on the author); an eponymous film based on the life of Ștefan Luchian was released in 1981, starring Florin Călinescu as Arghezi.

 Presence in English language anthologies 

 Testament – Anthology of Modern Romanian Verse / Testament – Antologie de Poezie Română Modernă – Bilingual Edition English & Romanian – Daniel Ioniță (editor and translator) with Eva Foster and Daniel Reynaud – MinervaPublishing 2012 and 2015 (second edition) – 
 Testament – Anthology of Romanian Verse – American Edition - monolingual English language edition – Daniel Ioniță (editor and principal translator) with Eva Foster, Daniel Reynaud and Rochelle Bews – Australian-Romanian Academy for Culture – 2017 – 
 Born in Utopia – An anthology of Modern and Contemporary Romanian Poetry - Carmen Firan and Paul Doru Mugur (editors) with Edward Foster – Talisman House Publishers – 2006 – 

Notes

References
Tudor Arghezi, Scrieri. Proze ("Writings. Prose"), Editura Minerva, Bucharest, 1985
Lucian Boia, History and Myth in Romanian Consciousness, Central European University Press, 2001
George Călinescu, Istoria literaturii române. Compendiu ("The History of Romanian Literature. Compendium"), Editura Minerva, Bucharest, 1983
Dennis Deletant, Communist Terror in Romania, C. Hurst & Co., London, 1999 
Victor Frunză, Istoria stalinismului în România ("The History of Stalinism in Romania"), Humanitas, Bucharest, 1990
 Dumitru Hâncu, "Tudor Arghezi. Scrisori din închisoare (II)" ("Letters from Prison (II)"), in Ziarul Financiar, 30 October 2002
Kathleen Kuiper, Merriam-Webster's Encyclopedia of Literature, Merriam-Webster, Springfield, Massachusetts, 1995 
Eugen Marinescu (ed.), Din presa literară românească (1918–1944) ("From the Romanian Literary Press (1918–1944)"), Editura Albatros, Bucharest, 1986
D. Murăraşu, Din presa literară românească (1900–1918) ("From the Romanian Literary Press (1900–1918)"), Editura Albatros, Bucharest, 1970
 Alexandra Olivotto, "Cele mai nocive cărți din cultura românească" ("The Most Noxious Books in Romanian Culture"), in Cotidianul, 18 October 2005
Z. Ornea, Anii treizeci. Extrema dreaptă românească ("The 1930s: The Romanian Far Right"), Editura Fundației Culturale Române, Bucharest, 1995
Grigore Traian Pop, "Cînd dissidența se pedepseşte cu moartea. Un asasinat ritual: Mihail Stelescu" ("When Dissidence Is Punished with Death. A Ritual Assassination: Mihail Stelescu"), in Dosarele Istoriei, 6/IV (1999)
 Ion Simuţ, "Putea fi Arghezi legionar?" ("Could Arghezi Have Been a Legionary?"), in România Literară, nr.5, 9 February 2007; available through România Culturală, "Polemici" ("Polemics") page
Vladimir Tismăneanu, Stalinism for All Seasons: A Political History of Romanian Communism, University of California Press, Berkeley, 2003 
 Constantin Ţoiu, "Amintiri cu poeți" ("Memoirs of Poets"), at Memoria.ro; retrieved 16 July 2007
Tudor Vianu, Scriitori români ("Romanian Writers"), Vol. III, Ed. Minerva, Bucharest, 1971
Mark Willhardt, Alan Michael Parker (ed.), Who's Who in 20th Century World Poetry. Routledge, London, 2000 
 Gheorghe Zbuchea,  Despre problema basarabeană în politica externă a României în anii 1912–1916 ("On the Bessarabian Issue in Romanian Foreign Policy in the Years 1912–1916"), at the University of Bucharest; retrieved 16 July 2007
Henri Zalis, introduction to Lucia Demetrius, Album de familie. Nuvele alese (1935–1965) ("Family Album. Selected Short Stories (1935–1965)"), Editura pentru literatură, Bucharest, 1967, pp. V–XXXI
 Krikor Zambaccian, Însemnările unui amator de artă ("The Recordings of an Art Aficionado"), published and hosted by LiterNet; retrieved 16 July 2007
 C. D. Zeletin, "Cu George Emil Palade, la San Diego, despre boala lui Tudor Arghezi" ("With George Emil Palade, in San Diego, on the Topic of Tudor Arghezi's Disease"), at Memoria.ro; retrieved 16 July 2007

External links
Membrii Academiei Române din 1866 până în prezent – A
 Poems by Arghezi
 Romanian Poetry – Tudor Arghezi
 Essays by Arghezi, published in Jurnalul Naţional'':
Repaosul duminical/Metehnele realităţilor româneşti (1912), 5 March 2006
Poliția, femeia, prostituția (1912), 12 March 2006
Viile Domnului (1912), 9 April 2006
Piticul cel norocos (1930), 21 April 2006
Doi Vecini and Ștefan Luchian at the Internet Movie Database

Romanian male poets
Romanian male novelists
Romanian art critics
Romanian children's writers
Romanian essayists
Romanian humorists
Romanian magazine editors
Romanian magazine founders
Romanian columnists
Romanian theatre critics
Symbolist novelists
Symbolist poets
Contimporanul writers
Writers from Bucharest
Saint Sava National College alumni
Romanian Orthodox monks
Romanian monarchists
Romanian socialists
Adevărul columnists
Romanian people of World War I
Inmates of Târgu Jiu camp
Socialist Republic of Romania rehabilitations
Recipients of the Order of the Star of the Romanian Socialist Republic
Titular members of the Romanian Academy
Members of the Great National Assembly
Obscenity controversies in literature
1880 births
1967 deaths
20th-century Romanian poets
20th-century Romanian novelists
Male essayists
20th-century essayists
Herder Prize recipients
20th-century pseudonymous writers